Marco Siffredi (22 May 1979 – 8 September 2002) was a French snowboarder and mountaineer who hailed from a climbing family; his father was a mountain guide, and his older brother Pierre had died in an avalanche in their hometown of Chamonix, France. Siffredi was the first to descend Mount Everest on a snowboard, completing this feat in 2001 via the Norton Couloir. In 2002, he disappeared after making his second Everest summit, while attempting to snowboard the Hornbein Couloir; his body has never been found.

First snowboard descent at Nant Blanc 
In his early years, Marco Siffredi made several first descents in the Chamonix valley before extending his horizons to bigger peaks. In June 1999, he made the second-ever descent of Mont Blanc on the Aiguille Verte, after Jean-Marc Boivin’s ski descent in 1989.

First Everest descent 
Siffredi reached the summit of Everest, a 8,849-meter mountain, on May 23, 2001 with the help of oxygen along with two Sherpas who brought the equipment. He was forced to choose an alternative route to the one he considered the "Holy Grail" of snowboarding, as the Hornbein Couloir did not have enough snow. Instead, he rode down the Norton Couloir back to Advanced Base Camp (ABC) at the foot of the North Col. Then he began the descent down the Norton Couloir of the north face, but after 200 meters a fastening strap on his snowboard broke due to the cold . After repairing it with help from a sherpa, Siffredi continued the descent to 6,400 meters in two hours.

The day before, on May 22, Austrian climber Stefan Gatt reached the summit alone and without using oxygen. He went on a snowboard up to 8,600 meters along the north wall, but at that altitude he found very hard snow and decided to continue without snowboarding. There were disputes about who would be awarded the first snowboard descent of Everest, as Gatt got out first, but did not use a snowboard for about 1,000 m. The site everestnews.com, attributed primacy to Siffredi but the site snowboarding.transworld.net, recognized merits and demerits to both, so the record was shared.

Second Everest descent
Early in August 2002, Siffredi departed for Nepal, intending to make the first snowboard descent of Everest along the Hornbein Couloir.  It was late in the season for summitting Everest, but Siffredi hoped that the passage would have more snow.  On August 10, he left Kathmandu with three sherpa (Phurba, Pa Nuru and Da Tenzing), reaching base camp  in Tibet on August 14. On September 7, the group reached the advanced field at 8,300 m.  On Sept. 8, 2002, Siffredi and the sherpas reached the summit at 2:10 PM.  According to Phurba Tashi, however, Siffredi showed little enthusiasm for the accomplishment, commenting that he was "Tired, tired...too much climbing..."

After weather conditions began to change, the Sherpas urged Siffredi not to go. Siffredi ignored their warnings and after an hour's rest, began making his way towards the Hornbein just after 3pm.  His sherpa companions lost sight of him periodically.  At the North Col, about 1,300 meters below Camp Three, both Sherpas reported seeing the distant image of a man stand up, then slide silently down the mountain. As they reached the point of the sighting, Siffredi's snowboard tracks were not to be seen. His body has not been found.

Other achievements

In May 1996, Siffredi snowboarded down the north face of the Aiguille du Midi on Mont Blanc along the Mallory track, a descent of 1,000 meters with passages of more than 50-degree incline. In 1998, in preparation for climbing the Himalayas, he climbed Tocllaraju in Peru (6,032 m) with Philippe Forte and René Robert. In 1999 he climbed Dorje Lhakpa (6,988 m) in Nepal and made the first snowboard descent of the mountain.

In autumn 2001, he climbed Shisha Pangma, Himalayas (8,027 m) with the intention of making the entire descent by snowboard, but strong winds prevented the attempt.

See also
List of people who died climbing Mount Everest

References

Further reading

https://www.amazon.com/See-You-Tomorrow-Disappearance-Snowboarder-ebook/dp/B08W1MQ1YW/ref=nodl_

External links 
 The Disappearance of Marco Siffredi, article from TransWorld SNOWboarding Magazine: The Disappearance Of Marco Siffredi.
 : Article from MountainZone.com: Steep Ascents and First Descents (Siffredi's second descent of Nant Blanc, Aiguille Verte) Trey Cook on Showboarding
 https://www.snowboarder.com/transworld-snowboarding-archive/snowboarding-photos/the-disappearance-of-marco-siffredi/ 
 https://allthatsinteresting.com/marco-siffredi 

1979 births
2002 deaths
French male snowboarders
French mountain climbers
Mountaineering deaths on Mount Everest
Deceased Everest summiters